Astragalus microcymbus is a species of flowering plant in the legume family known by the common name skiff milkvetch. It is endemic to Colorado in the United States, where it is known from Gunnison County and the edge of Saguache County.

In May and June it produces many white flowers with purple-tinged petals. The species name means "little boat", referring to the legume pods, which resemble skiffs. It grows in sagebrush habitat and sagebrush-juniper mixed habitat.

The total global population is estimated to be around 10,000 individuals. The species is threatened by rabbit herbivory.

The species has been the subject of monitoring and research by scientists at Denver Botanic Gardens since 1995.

References

External links
USDA Plants Profile

microcymbus
Flora of Colorado